The 2012 Autopolis GT 300km was the seventh round of the 2012 Super GT season. It took place on September 30, 2012.

Race results

References
 Race results 

Autopolis GT 300km